Alex Gonzalez, Alex González, Álex González or Alexander Gonzalez may refer to:

 Alex Gonzalez (pitcher) (born 1992), American baseball pitcher
 Alex Gonzalez (shortstop, born 1973), American baseball player
 Alexander Gonzalez (businessman) (born 1945), former president of California State University, Sacramento and California State University, San Marcos
 Alexandre Gonzalez (born 1951), French long-distance runner
 Alexander González (cyclist) (born 1979), Colombian cyclist
 Alexander González (footballer, born 1992), Venezuelan footballer
 Alexander González (footballer, born 1994), Panamanian footballer
 Alex González (musician) (born 1969), American musician
 Álex González (actor) (born 1980), Spanish actor
 Álex González (boxer) (born 1974), Puerto Rican boxer
 Álex González (shortstop, born 1977), Venezuelan baseball player